Japan participated in the 1951 Asian Games held in the capital city of New Delhi, India.
This country was ranked 1st with 24 gold medals, 21 silver medals and 15 bronze medals with a total of 60 medals
to secure its top spot in the medal tally. Japan sent a total of 65 athletes to the Games, 58 men and 7 women.

See also
Japan at the 1952 Summer Olympics

References

Nations at the 1951 Asian Games
1951
Asian Games